Gruffydd Maelor (died 1191) was Prince of Powys Fadog in Wales. 

He is known as Gruffydd Maelor I to distinguish him from his grandson, Gruffydd Maelor II (died 1269).

Lineage 
He was a son of Prince Madog ap Maredudd by Susanna, daughter of King Gruffudd ap Cynan. He was to be the founder of the principal ruling family of northern Powys during the 13th century.

Inheritance 
On his father's death in 1160 Powys was divided between his three sons (Gruffydd, Owain Brogyntyn and Owain Fychan), a nephew (Owain Cyfeiliog) and a half-brother (Iorwerth Goch ap Maredudd).

Gruffydd received Maelor (also known as Bromfield) and Iâl (also known as Yale), as his allotted portion of Powys. He later added Nanheudwy, Cynllaith Owain and Mochnant Is Rhaeadr after the death of his half-brother Owain Fychan in 1187.

Unification of northern Powys
His inherited and acquired lands in effect unified and reunited most of northern Powys forming what became known as Powys Fadog after it was inherited by his son.

Marriage 
He married Angharad, his cousin and daughter of Owain Gwynedd, King of Gwynedd.

Death and issue 
He died in 1191, leaving issue:

 Madog, who succeeded his father.
 Owen, joint ruler with his brother, died 1197.

References and sources 
Prof. T Jones Pierce MA FSA, The History of Wales (Aberystwyth)
Lloyd, History of Wales

1191 deaths
Monarchs of Powys
12th-century Welsh monarchs
Year of birth unknown
Welsh princes
House of Mathrafal
The Lordship of Bromfield and Yale